Ribosomal DNA (rDNA) is a DNA sequence that codes for ribosomal RNA. These sequences regulate transcription initiation and amplification, and contain both transcribed and non-transcribed spacer segments.

In the human genome there are 5 chromosomes with nucleolus organizer regions: the acrocentric chromosomes 13 (RNR1), 14 (RNR2), 15 (RNR3), 21 (RNR4) and 22 (RNR5).  The genes that are responsible for encoding the various sub-units of rRNA are located across multiple chromosomes in humans. But the genes that encode for rRNA are highly conserved across the domains, with only the copy numbers involved for the genes having varying numbers per species. In Bacteria, Archaea, and chloroplasts the rRNA is composed of different (smaller) units, the large (23S) ribosomal RNA, 16S ribosomal RNA and 5S rRNA. The 16S rRNA is widely used for phylogenetic studies.

Eukaryotes 
The rRNA transcribed from the approximately 600 rDNA repeats forms the most abundant section of RNA found in cells of eukaryotes. Ribosomes are assemblies of proteins and rRNA molecules that translate mRNA molecules to produce proteins. As shown in the figure, rDNA of eukaryotes consists of a tandem repeat of a unit segment, composed of NTS, ETS, 18S, ITS1, 5.8S, ITS2, and 28S tracts. rDNA has another gene, coding for 5S rRNA, located in the genome in most eukaryotes. 5S rDNA is also present in independent tandem repeats as in Drosophila. DNA regions that are repetitive often undergo recombination events. The rDNA repeats have many regulatory mechanisms that keep the DNA from undergoing mutations, thus keeping the rDNA conserved.

In the nucleus, the rDNA region of the chromosome is visualized as a nucleolus which forms expanded chromosomal loops with rDNA. The rRNA transcriptional units are clustered in tandem repeats. These rDNA regions are also called nucleolus organizer regions, as they give rise to the nucleolus. In rDNA, the tandem repeats are mostly found in the nucleolus; but heterochromatic rDNA is found outside of the nucleolus. However, transcriptionally active rDNA resides inside of the nucleolus itself.

Sequence homogeneity 

In the large rDNA array, polymorphisms between rDNA repeat units are very low, indicating that rDNA tandem arrays are evolving through concerted evolution. However, the mechanism of concerted evolution is imperfect, such that polymorphisms between repeats within an individual can occur at significant levels and may confound phylogenetic analyses for closely related organisms.

5S tandem repeat sequences in several Drosophila were compared with each other; the result revealed that insertions and deletions occurred frequently between species and often flanked by conserved sequences. They could occur by slippage of the newly synthesized strand during DNA replication or by gene conversion.

Sequence divergence 
The rDNA transcription tracts have low rate of polymorphism among species, which allows interspecific comparison to elucidate phylogenetic relationship using only a few specimens. Coding regions of rDNA are highly conserved among species but ITS regions are variable due to insertions, deletions, and point mutations. Between remote species as human and frog comparison of sequences at ITS tracts is not appropriate. Conserved sequences at coding regions of rDNA allow comparisons of remote species, even between yeast and human. Human 5.8S rRNA has 75% identity with yeast 5.8S rRNA. 
In cases for sibling species, comparison of the rDNA segment including ITS tracts among species and phylogenetic analysis are made satisfactorily.
The different coding regions of the rDNA repeats usually show distinct evolutionary rates. As a result, this DNA can provide phylogenetic information of species belonging to wide systematic levels.

Recombination-stimulating activity 

A fragment of yeast rDNA containing the 5S gene, non-transcribed spacer DNA, and part of the 35S gene has localized cis-acting mitotic recombination stimulating activity.  This DNA fragment contains a mitotic recombination hotspot, referred to as HOT1. HOT1 expresses recombination-stimulating activity when it is inserted into novel locations in the yeast genome. HOT1 includes an RNA polymerase I (PolI) transcription promoter that catalyzes 35S ribosomal rRNA gene transcription. In a PolI defective mutant, the HOT1 hotspot recombination-stimulating activity is abolished. The level of PolI transcription in HOT1 appears to determine the level of recombination.

Clinical significance 
Diseases can be associated with DNA mutations where DNA can be expanded, such as Huntington's disease, or lost due to deletion mutations. The same is true for mutations that occur in rDNA repeats; it has been found that if the genes that are associated with the synthesis of ribosomes are disrupted or mutated, it can result in various diseases associated with the skeleton or bone marrow. Also, any damage or disruption to the enzymes that protect the tandem repeats of the rDNA, can result in lower synthesis of ribosomes, which also lead to other defects in the cell. Neurological diseases can also arise from mutations in the rDNA tandem repeats, such as Bloom syndrome, which occurs when the number of tandem repeats increases close to a hundred-fold; compared with that of the normal number of tandem repeats. Various types of cancers can also be born from mutations of the tandem repeats in the ribosomal DNA. Cell lines can become malignant from either a rearrangement of the tandem repeats, or an expansion of the repeats in the rDNA.

References 

DNA